The Oklahoma City Public Schools, abbreviated OKCPS, is a multicultural public school district serving most of the urban area of Oklahoma City, Oklahoma. It is the second largest primary and secondary education district in the state of Oklahoma, after Tulsa Public Schools, with 66 schools and approximately 32,086 students enrolled students during the 2021–2022 school year.

History
Subscription schools were the first schools in Oklahoma Territory, but public schools began to emerge in the 1890s, shortly before 1907 statehood. By 1909, Oklahoma City had ten public school buildings. By 1930 the city had three high schools, six junior high schools, and 51 elementary schools with an enrollment of 38,593.

Schools

High schools
Capitol Hill High School
Classen School of Advanced Studies
Dove Science Academy
Frederick A. Douglass High School
Emerson North Alternative High School
Emerson South Middle-High School
U. S. Grant High School
Harding Charter Preparatory High School
Harding Fine Arts Academy
John Marshall High School
Northwest Classen High School
Oklahoma Centennial High School
Santa Fe South Charter High School
Santa Fe South Pathways Middle College
Southeast High School
Star Spencer High School

Middle schools
Jefferson Middle School
Roosevelt Middle School
Taft Middle School
Northeast Academy
Belle Isle Enterprise
John W. Rex Charter
Oklahoma Centennial Mid-High School
Rogers Middle School
Emerson South Mid-high School
Douglass Mid-High School
Classen School of Advanced Studies
Webster Middle School
Southeast Middle School

References 

Education in Oklahoma City
School districts in Oklahoma
School districts established in 1889